Memus is a small village in Angus, Scotland, north of Kirriemuir. It is home to the Drovers Pub. A story is told of a kelpie at Shielhill Bridge, leaving its cloven hoofprint behind on a stone as a petrosomatoglyph.

Notes

References

Villages in Angus, Scotland